Dadyanos is a monospecific genus of marine ray-finned fish belonging to the family Zoarcidae, the eelpouts. Its only species is Dadyanos insignis which is found in the southwestern Atlantic Ocean.

References

Lycodinae
Monotypic ray-finned fish genera
Taxa named by Franz Steindachner